They've Kidnapped a Man (Italian: Hanno rapito un uomo) is a 1938 Italian "white-telephones" comedy film directed by Gennaro Righelli and starring Vittorio De Sica, Caterina Boratto and Maria Denis.

It was shot at the Cinecittà Studios in Rome. The film's sets were designed by the art director Alfredo Montori.

Cast
 Vittorio De Sica as L'attore cinematografico 
 Caterina Boratto as La granduchessa Sonia 
 Maria Denis as L'amichetta del attore 
 Evelina Paoli as La zia di Sonia 
 Romolo Costa as L'arciduca Cirillo
 Clara Calamai
 Raffaele Inghilo Ivanitsky
 Cirillo Konopleff
 Giulio Mostocotto
 Gennaro Sabatano
 Carlo Simoneschi

References

Bibliography 
 Roberto Chiti & Roberto Poppi. I film: Tutti i film italiani dal 1930 al 1944. Gremese Editore, 2005.

External links 
 

1938 films
Italian comedy films
Italian black-and-white films
1938 comedy films
1930s Italian-language films
Films directed by Gennaro Righelli
Films shot at Cinecittà Studios
1930s Italian films